The Esadze is a Georgian family name from the Guria region in western Georgia.

The Esadze family name comes from these towns of Guria: Baileti, Likhauri, Natanebi, Ozurgeti, Shemokmedi, and Tsitelmta.

References

Georgian-language surnames